Pholidoptera littoralis is a species of insect belonging to the family Tettigoniidae subfamily Tettigoniinae. It is found from Greece across much of the Balkan Peninsula on to the Italian Alpine foothills, Switzerland and Austria to Germany, the Czech Republic, Poland and Slovakia, where it is less common.

References

Orthoptera of Europe
Insects described in 1853
Tettigoniinae